In World War II, the United States Navy used submarines heavily. Overall, 263 US submarines undertook war patrols, claiming 1,392 ships and 5,583,400 tons during the war. Submarines in the United States Navy were responsible for sinking 540,192 tons or 30% of the Japanese navy and 4,779,902 tons of shipping, or 54.6% of all Japanese shipping in the Pacific Theater. Submarines were responsible for laying 18,553 mines. At the beginning of the war, Japanese merchant ships had a carrying capacity of around six million tons. By the end of the war, in August 1945, the capacity was two million, with only 320,000 in condition to carry cargo. 
Submarine warfare began on 7 December 1941, when the Chief of Naval Operations ordered the navy to "execute unrestricted air and submarine warfare against Japan." It appears the policy was executed without the knowledge or prior consent of the government. The London Naval Treaty, to which the U.S. was signatory, required submarines to abide by prize rules (commonly known as "cruiser rules"). It did not prohibit arming merchantmen, but arming them, or having them report contact with submarines (or raiders), made them de facto naval auxiliaries and removed the protection of the cruiser rules. This made restrictions on submarines effectively moot. U.S. Navy submarines also conducted reconnaissance patrols, landed special forces and guerrilla troops and performed search and rescue tasks. The submarines were so successful that by early 1944, they struggled to find targets. The war against shipping was the single most decisive factor in the collapse of the Japanese economy, and the Cabinet of Japan reported to the National Diet after the war that  “the greatest cause of defeat was the loss of shipping.”

Starting in 1941, submarines patrolled the American Theater, hunting German U-boats and protecting shipping lanes. Submarine Squadron 50, formed in 1942, served in the European Theater. The squadron was present in several invasions, and hunted blockade runners, first off of Spain and later Norway. The ships scored several hits, but a lack of targets led to them being returned to the United States.

Total tonnage 

With 116,454 tons sunk, the USS Tang sank the most tonnage of shipping in World War II for the United States. Its tonnage was revised from the Joint Army–Navy Assessment Committee (JANAC) report, which initially credited Tang with fewer sinkings. (93,824 tons and 24 ships) In 1980, the relevant JANAC section was officially replaced and updated. The Tang sank more than 16,000 tons over the second highest submarine, the USS Flasher (100,231). All 23 other submarines sank between 99,901 (USS Rasher) and 59,800 (USS Archerfish) tons. Fourteen of the submarines were Gato-class, six were Balao-class, four were Tambor-class and one was Sargo-class.

Ships sunk 

With 33 ships sunk, the USS Tang sank the most tonnage of shipping in World War II for the United States. Its tonnage was revised from the Joint Army–Navy Assessment Committee (JANAC) report, which initially credited Tang with fewer sinkings. (93,824 tons and 24 ships) In 1980, the relevant JANAC section was officially replaced and updated. The Tautog sank the second most, with 26. The other submarines sank from 23 (Silversides) to 14 (Kingfish) ships. Seventeen ships were Gato-class, four were Balao-class and three were Tambor-class.

See also
 Allied submarines in the Pacific War
 List of lost United States submarines
 List of successful U-boats

Notes

References

Bibliography

 

Submarines